Kvarnstad is a small village on the island Öland, Sweden. It belongs to the municipality Borgholm.

Populated places in Borgholm Municipality